The 1939–40 was the 67th season of competitive football in Scotland.  It would have been the 50th season of Scottish Football League, but the outbreak of the Second World War on 3 September 1939 caused the suspension of the league after five rounds of games played in Division One, and four rounds in Division Two. The league was not officially competed for until the 1946–47 season but there were regional leagues played during these years.

League competitions

Scottish League Division One

Scottish League Division Two

Emergency League

The Scottish League officially suspended its competition on 13 September 1939 and set up a committee to investigate the possibility of regional league competitions. These were rubber-stamped on 26 September after the Home Secretary had granted permission, they commenced a month later. There were two divisions; eastern and western; each consisting of 16 clubs. This left six of the previous league clubs; Montrose, Brechin City, Forfar Athletic, Leith Athletic, Edinburgh City and East Stirlingshire.

Cowdenbeath resigned halfway through the season, they had played all the other clubs once and so their record was allowed to stand. The competition was completed by a play-off between the two divisional winners, who were Rangers and Falkirk, Rangers won 2–1 at Ibrox Park.

Play-off

Other honours

Cup honours

National

County

Non-league honours

Senior

Notes

See also 
1939–40 Rangers F.C. season

Association football during World War II
Scotland national football team results (unofficial matches)

References

External links 
Scottish Football Historical Archive

 
Wartime seasons in Scottish football